The 1992–93 season was the 69th season in the existence of AEK Athens F.C. and the 34th consecutive season in the top flight of Greek football. They competed in the Alpha Ethniki, the Greek Cup, the Greek Super Cup and the UEFA Champions League. The season began on 16 August 1992 and finished on 6 June 1993.

Overview

Another great season for AEK Athens, which won the league for the second season in a row. The summer of 1992 was historic anyway, since the club changed hands after 11 whole years. Andreas Zafiropoulos transferred the majority of the shares to the duo of Melissanidis-Karras. The new owners of PAE, without being famous for their huge "wealth" at the time, but with their management experience from other clubs, their passion for football and their indisputable abilities, proved to be decisive factors for their administrative tenure in club. The first thing they did was to back up Dušan Bajević. However, their term in the team began with great difficulties since two very important players from the previous season left before the 2 businessmen took over the team. Specifically, Daniel Batista chose to move to Olympiacos, while Giorgos Savvidis decided to return to Cyprus. On the other hand, they made some not so impressive, but useful transfers with the acquisition of Slišković, Agorogiannis, Mitropoulos, Papadopoulos, Atmatsidis. Furthermore in December Tsiartas and Kopitsis were transferred to the team.

Bajević again displayed a well-worked team, which passionately claimed the championship since the beginning of the season, while also presenting quite a beautiful sight. Eventually, AEK won the championship for the second consecutive season, this time with a one-point difference from the second-placed Panathinaikos. Biggest victory of the season, the impressive 7–0 over Korinthos. The victory during the last game against the indifferent Olympiacos in Nea Filadelfeia, sealed the title over Panathinaikos. AEK had the also at total of 17 win out of 17 games in their ground and that it was first in the standings for 32 of the 34 matchdays of the championship.

In the First round of UEFA Champions League, AEK faced APOEL in a seemingly very easy draw for the Greek champions. Fast enough, their excitement proved reckless in the first leg, which ended at 1–1. Thus, the Cypriots gained a qualification advantage and AEK's trip to Nicosia was predicted to be much more difficult than expected. In the second leg, AEK led relatively early with 2–0, however, towards the end of the match and after defensive mistakes, they were equalized, with the result that until the end of the match was in danger of being disqualified. The Cypriots pressed hard, the moments in defense were nightmarish, however, after hard work and suffering, the team secured qualification to the second round of the competition. AEK's next opponent was the mighty PSV Eindhoven, who lined up with all their stars except Romário, who Westerhof kept in the bench. Very quickly, however, due to Vanenburg's injury, the great Brazilian striker entered the game and forced AEK to back down in the second half, despite their offensive approach until that time. During the second half, AEK took the lead with a goal of incredible beauty by Dimitriadis, but from then on, the Dutch began to press hard and show their footballing qualities with AEK resisting successfully and finally securing the precious victory. The rematch in the Netherlands did not start with the best of signs, as already at the end of the game in the match at Nikos Goumas Stadium, Romário boldly declared that PSV would not face a problem in the rematch because he himself would score 3 goals! In a nightmarish night for Christos Vasilopoulos, Romário's "prophecy" came true and PSV scattered AEK with a score of 3–0, with three goals from the Brazilian superstar! At no point in the game was the team of Bajević able to react and fatefully came the fair disqualification.

In the first round of the Greek Cup, AEK easily finished first in a group with Apollon Athens, Panargiakos, Poseidon Michaniona. Afterwards they easily eliminated Ionikos with 2 victories and with much more difficulty, Atromitos. In the quarter-finals, they lost 1–0 to AEL at the Alcazar Stadium and won 1–0 at home. The match went to extra time, at the beginning of which AEL scored, but in the end with 2 goals the yellow-blacks got a great qualification-thriller, with a final score of 3–1. In the semi-finals of the tournament, AEK were drawn with Olympiacos, from whom they lost in the first match 1–0, away from home. In the rematch, AEK equalized the score of the first match and the match went to extra time for the 3rd consecutive round. The red and whites scored with a questionable penalty and then made it 1–2, while AEK again scoring 2 goals in the last quarter of overtime, simply got an honorable victory with 3–2 and their elimination from the tournament.

The leaders of AEK for this important season were Vasilis Dimitriadis, Toni Savevski, Stelios Manolas, Alexis Alexandris, Refik Šabanadžović and Antonis Minou. Dimitriadis was the top scorer of AEK and of the league with 33 goals in 34 matches and even emerged as the 2nd scorer in Europe, winning the European Silver Shoe.

Players

Squad information

NOTE: The players are the ones that have been announced by the AEK Athens' press release. No edits should be made unless a player arrival or exit is announced. Updated 30 June 1993, 23:59 UTC+3.

Transfers

In

Summer

Winter

Out

Summer

Winter

Loan out

Winter

Overall transfer activity

Expenditure
Summer:  ₯0

Winter:  ₯100,000,000

Total:  ₯100,000,000

Income
Summer:  ₯0

Winter:  ₯0

Total:  ₯0

Net Totals
Summer:  ₯0

Winter:  ₯100,000,000

Total:  ₯100,000,000

Pre-season and friendlies

Greek Super Cup

Alpha Ethniki

League table

Results summary

Results by Matchday

Fixtures

Greek Cup

Group 15

Matches

Round of 32

Round of 16

Quarter-finals

Semi-finals

UEFA Champions League

First round

Second round

Statistics

Squad statistics

! colspan="13" style="background:#FFDE00; text-align:center" | Goalkeepers
|-

! colspan="13" style="background:#FFDE00; color:black; text-align:center;"| Defenders
|-

! colspan="13" style="background:#FFDE00; color:black; text-align:center;"| Midfielders
|-

! colspan="13" style="background:#FFDE00; color:black; text-align:center;"| Forwards
|-

! colspan="13" style="background:#FFDE00; color:black; text-align:center;"| Left during Winter Transfer window
|-

|}

Disciplinary record

|-
! colspan="20" style="background:#FFDE00; text-align:center" | Goalkeepers

|-
! colspan="20" style="background:#FFDE00; color:black; text-align:center;"| Defenders

|-
! colspan="20" style="background:#FFDE00; color:black; text-align:center;"| Midfielders

|-
! colspan="20" style="background:#FFDE00; color:black; text-align:center;"| Forwards

|-
! colspan="20" style="background:#FFDE00; color:black; text-align:center;"| Left during Winter Transfer window

|}

References

External links
AEK Athens F.C. Official Website

AEK Athens F.C. seasons
AEK Athens
Greek football championship-winning seasons